Presidential elections were held in Chile in 1861. Carried out through a system of electors, they resulted in the election of José Joaquín Pérez as President.

Pérez was a "unity" candidate between the conservatives and liberals. He won the election unanimously.

Results

References

Presidential elections in Chile
Chile
1861 in Chile